Sanguéya is a town in western Guinea. It is located in Boke Prefecture in the Boke Region. The population is 8,217 (2008 est).

References

External links
Satellite map at Maplandia.com

Populated places in the Boké Region